The Constituent Assembly of India was elected to frame the Constitution of India. It was elected by the 'Provincial Assembly'. Following India's independence from the British rule in 1947, its members served as the nation's first Parliament as the 'Provisional Parliament of India'.

The idea for a Constituent Assembly was proposed in December 1934 by M. N. Roy, a pioneer of the Communist movement in India and an advocate of radical democracy. It became an official demand of the Indian National Congress in 1935. The Indian National Congress held its session at Lucknow in April 1936 presided by Jawaharlal Nehru. The official demand for Constituent Assembly was raised and Government of India Act, 1935 was rejected as it imposed the Constitution which was against the will of the Indians. C. Rajagopalachari voiced the demand for a Constituent Assembly on 15 November 1939 based on adult franchise, and was accepted by the British in August 1940.

On 8 August 1940, a statement was made by Viceroy Lord Linlithgow about the expansion of the Governor-General's Executive Council and the establishment of a War Advisory Council. This offer, known as the August Offer, included giving full weight to minority opinions and allowing Indians to draft their own constitution. Under the Cabinet Mission Plan of 1946, elections were held for the first time for the Constituent Assembly. The Constitution of India was drafted by the Constituent Assembly, and it was implemented under the Cabinet Mission Plan on 16 May 1946. The members of the Constituent Assembly were elected by the provincial assemblies by a single, transferable-vote system of proportional representation. The total membership of the Constituent Assembly was 389 of which 292 were representatives of the provinces, 93 represented the princely states and four were from the chief commissioner provinces of Delhi, Ajmer-Merwara, Coorg and British Baluchistan.

The elections for the 296 seats assigned to the British Indian provinces were completed by August 1946. Congress won 208 seats, and the Muslim League 73. After this election, the Muslim League refused to cooperate with the Congress and the political situation deteriorated. Hindu-Muslim riots began, and the Muslim League demanded a separate constituent assembly for Muslims in India. On 3 June 1947 Lord Mountbatten, the last British Governor-General of India, announced his intention to scrap the Cabinet Mission Plan; this culminated in the Indian Independence Act 1947 and the separate nations of India and Pakistan. The Indian Independence Act was passed on 18 July 1947 and, although it was earlier declared that India would become independent in June 1948, this event led to independence on 15 August 1947. The Constituent Assembly met for the first time on 9 December 1946, reassembling on 14 August 1947 as a sovereign body and successor to the British parliament's authority in India.

As a result of the partition, under the Mountbatten plan, a separate Constituent Assembly of Pakistan was established on 3 June 1947. The representatives of the areas incorporated into Pakistan ceased to be members of the Constituent Assembly of India. New elections were held for the West Punjab and East Bengal (which became part of Pakistan, although East Bengal later seceded to become Bangladesh); the membership of the Constituent Assembly was 299 after the reorganization, and it met on 31 December 1947.
The constitution was drafted by 299 delegates from different caste, region, religion, gender etc. These delegates sat over 114 days spread over 3 years (2 years 11 months and 18 days to be precise) and discussed what the constitution should contain and what laws should be included. The Drafting Committee of the Constitution was chaired by B. R. Ambedkar.

Description of the constituent assembly
The Constituent Assembly of India, consisting of indirectly elected representatives, was established to draft a constitution for India (including the now-separate countries of Pakistan and Bangladesh). It existed for approx three years, the first parliament of India after independence in 1947. The Assembly was not elected based on universal adult suffrage, and Muslims and Sikhs received special representation as minorities. The Muslim League boycotted the Assembly after failing to prevent its creation. Although a large part of the Constituent Assembly was drawn from the Congress Party in a one-party environment, the Congress Party included a wide diversity of opinions—from conservative industrialists to radical Marxists, to Hindu revivalists.

The Assembly met for the first time in New Delhi on 9 December 1946, and its last session was held on 24 January 1950. The hope of the Assembly was expressed by Jawaharlal Nehru:

Background and election
India was still under British rule when the Constituent Assembly was established, following negotiations between Indian leaders and members of the 1946 Cabinet Mission to India from the United Kingdom. Provincial assembly elections were held in early 1946. Constituent Assembly members were elected indirectly by members of the newly elected provincial assemblies, and initially included representatives for those provinces that formed part of Pakistan (some of which are now in Bangladesh). The Constituent Assembly had 389 representatives, including fifteen women.

The Interim Government of India was formed on 2 September 1946 from the newly elected Constituent Assembly. The Congress Party held a large majority in the Assembly (69 percent of the seats), and the Muslim League held nearly all the seats reserved in the Assembly for Muslims. There were also members of smaller parties, such as the Scheduled Caste Federation, the Communist Party of India and the Unionist Party.

In June 1947 delegations from Sindh, East Bengal, Baluchistan, West Punjab and the North West Frontier Province withdrew to form the Constituent Assembly of Pakistan, meeting in Karachi. On 15 August 1947 the Dominion of India and Dominion of Pakistan became independent nations, and members of the Constituent Assembly who had not withdrawn to Karachi became India's Parliament. Twenty-eight members of the Muslim League joined the Indian Assembly, and 93 members were later nominated from the princely states.

Constitution and elections

At 11 AM on 9 December 1946, the Assembly began its first session, with 211 members attending. The Assembly approved the draft constitution on 26 November 1949. On 26 January 1950, the constitution took effect (commemorated as Republic Day), and the Constituent Assembly became the Provisional Parliament of India (continuing until after the first elections under the new constitution in 1952).

Organization
Dr. Rajendra Prasad was elected as the president and Harendra Coomar Mookerjee, a Christian from Bengal and former vice-chancellor of Calcutta University, was vice-president. Mookerjee, additionally to chairing the assembly's Minorities Committee, was appointed governor of West Bengal after India became a republic. Jurist B. N. Rau was appointed constitutional adviser to the assembly; Rau prepared the original draft of the constitution and was later appointed a judge in the Permanent Court of International Justice in The Hague.

The assembly's work had five stages:
Committees presented reports on issues.
B. N. Rau prepared an initial draft based on the reports and his research into the constitutions of other nations.
The drafting committee, chaired by B. R. Ambedkar, presented a detailed draft constitution which was published for public discussion.
The draft constitution was discussed, and amendments were proposed and enacted.
The constitution was adopted, with a committee of experts led by the Congress Party (known as the Congress Assembly Party) played a pivotal role.

==Timeline of Formation of  'The Constitution of India==9 December 1946: Formation of the Constituent Assembly (demanding a separate state, the Muslim League boycotted the meeting.)11 December 1946: President Appointed – ⁣Rajendra Prasad, vice-chairman Harendra Coomar Mookerjee and constitutional legal adviser B. N. Rau  (initially 389 members in total, which declined to 299 after partition. Out of 389, 292 were from government provinces, 4 from chief commissioner provinces and 93 from princely states)13 December 1946: An 'Objective Resolution' was presented by Jawaharlal Nehru, laying down the underlying principles of the constitution, which later became the Preamble of the constitution. 22 January 1947: Objective resolution unanimously adopted.22 July 1947: National flag adopted.15 August 1947: Achieved independence. India split into Dominion of India and Dominion of Pakistan. 29 August 1947: Drafting Committee appointed, with Dr. B. R. Ambedkar as the chairman. Other 6 members of the committee were: K.M.Munshi, Muhammed Saadulah, Alladi Krishnaswamy Iyer, Gopala Swami Ayyangar, N. Madhava Rao (He replaced B.L. Mitter who resigned due to ill-health), T. T. Krishnamachari (He replaced D.P. Khaitan who died in 1948).16 July 1948: Along with Harendra Coomar Mookerjee, V. T. Krishnamachari was also elected as the second vice-president of the Constituent Assembly.26 November 1949: 'Constitution of India' passed and adopted by the assembly.24 January 1950: Last meeting of the Constituent Assembly. 'Constitution of India' (with 395 articles, 8 schedules, 22 parts) was signed and accepted by all. 26 January 1950: The 'Constitution of India' came in to force after 2 years, 11 months and 18 Days, at a total expenditure of ₹6.4 million to finish.
Ganesh Vasudev Mavalankar was the first speaker when meeting the assembly of Lok Sabha, after turning republic.

 Committees of the Constituent Assembly 
The Constituent Assembly appointed a total of 22 committees to deal with different tasks of constitution-making. Out of these, Eight were major committees and the others were minor committees.Major Committees'''

 Drafting Committee – Bhimrao Ambedkar 
 Union Power Committee – Jawaharlal Nehru
 Union Constitution Committee – Jawaharlal Nehru
 Provincial Constitution Committee – Vallabhbhai Patel
 Advisory Committee on Fundamental Rights, Minorities and Tribal and Excluded Areas – Vallabhbhai Patel. This committee had the following subcommittees:
 Fundamental Rights Sub-Committee – J. B. Kripalani
 Minorities Sub-Committee – Harendra Coomar Mookerjee,
 North-East Frontier Tribal Areas and Assam Excluded & Partially Excluded Areas Sub-Committee – Gopinath Bordoloi
 Excluded and Partially Excluded Areas (Apart from those in Assam) Sub-Committee – A V Thakkar
 Rules of Procedure Committee – Rajendra Prasad
 States Committee (Committee for negotiating with states) – ⁣Jawaharlal Nehru
 Steering Committee – Rajendra Prasad
 Adhoc Committee on the National Flag – Rajendra Prasad
 Committee for the function of the Constitution Assembly – ⁣G V Mavlankar
 House Committee – ⁣B Pattabhi Sitaramayya
 Language Committee – ⁣Moturi Satyanarayana
 Order of Business Committee – ⁣K M Munshi

 Criticism 
The constitution has been, in more recent times, critiqued on the basis of the fact that the members of the Constituent Assembly were not truly chosen by universal suffrage, but rather were elected by provincial assemblies that themselves were not elected by universal suffrage.  In his book The Constitution of India: Miracle, Surrender, Hope, Rajeev Dhavan has argued that the Indian people did not have much say in the making of the Constitution which was they had no choice but to accept.

Prominent members
* Rajendra Prasad, President of the Constituent Assembly
 Bhim Rao Ambedkar, Finance Minister of Bihar
 Sir N. Madhava Rao, Dewan of Mysore
 Deep Narayan Singh, Cabinet Minister of Bihar
 Gopinath Bordoloi, Chief Minister of Assam
 Muhammad Saadulla
 P. Subbarayan
 Kailashnath Katju
 N. Gopalaswami Ayyangar
 T. T. Krishnamachari
 Rameshwar Prasad Sinha
 Durgabai Deshmukh
 K. M. Munshi
 M. Mohammed Ismael, President of the Indian Union Muslim League
 Krishna Ballabh Sahay
 Frank Anthony, Anglo-Indian representative
 Sarvepalli Radhakrishnan, Vice President of India
 John Mathai, Minister of Railways
 Pratap Singh Kairon
 K. Kamaraj, Chief Minister of Tamil Nadu
 Chidambaram Subramaniam
 Jaipal Singh Munda, Former Indian Hockey captain, and Tribal leader
 Hargovind Pant
 Kala Venkata Rao, Freedom fighter, AICC general secretary, minister of Madras and later Andhra Pradesh
 Hifzur Rahman Seoharwi, Islamic scholar and an activist of the Indian independence movement.
 Ranbir Singh Hooda

Members (by province/state)

Members who later withdrew after partition

Gallery

References

Further reading
Austin, Granville. The Indian Constitution, Cornerstone of a Nation.  New Delhi:  OUP India, 1999. .
Bipan Chandra, Mridula Mukherjee and Aditya Mukherjee. India Since Independence: Revised Edition''. New Delhi: Penguin Books India, 2008.
An Indian 10-episode TV series made by Rajya sabha TV called "SAMVIDHAN" described in detail how the Indian Constitution was made.

 
Constitutional history of India
Central Legislative Assembly of India
Political history of India